Sir Charles Malcolm Barclay-Harvey, KCMG (2 March 1890 – 17 November 1969) was a British politician and Governor of South Australia from 12 August 1939 until 26 April 1944.

The only child of James Charles Barclay-Harvey, of Dinnet House, Aberdeenshire, he was educated at Eton and at Christ Church, Oxford, and served in the 7th (Deeside Highland) Battalion of the Gordon Highlanders from 1909 to 1915, with the Home Staff from 1915 to 1916, with the Ministry of Munitions in London from 1916 to 1918 and in Paris from 1918 to 1919.

Barclay-Harvey was adopted as prospective Unionist candidate for East Aberdeenshire in 1914 and was Member of Parliament (MP) for Kincardine and Aberdeenshire West from 1923 to 1929 and from 1931 to 1939. He was Parliamentary Private Secretary to Sir John Gilmour from 1924 to 1929 and to Sir Godfrey Collins from 1932 to 1936, and was knighted in the 1936 Birthday Honours, for "political and public services".

He was married firstly, in 1912, to Margaret Joan, daughter of Henry de la Poer Beresford Heywood, of Wrentnall House, Shrewsbury, by whom he had a daughter. He married secondly, in 1938, to a widow, Lady Muriel Felicia Vere Liddell-Grainger, daughter of the 12th Earl of Lindsey, becoming stepfather of David Liddell-Grainger.

He was Honorary Colonel of the 4th Battalion of the Gordon Highlanders from 1939 to 1945, and was a Member of Aberdeen County Council from 1945 to 1955. He was a member of the Royal Company of Archers.

He was appointed the Governor of South Australia in March 1939, whereupon he resigned from the House of Commons on 8 March and was appointed . He, his wife and two stepchildren then moved to Adelaide. He took office on 12 August, shortly before the outbreak of World War II. His principal focus during his tenure was the war effort. His wife, Lady Muriel, founded the Lady Muriel Nurses' Club for servicewomen, and made a habit of visiting numerous Red Cross branches. She also opened the Pioneer Women's Memorial Gardens in Adelaide on 19 April 1941 and launched the corvette HMAS Whyalla, the first ship from the World War II shipyard at Whyalla on 12 May 1941. He was also a Freemason. During his term as Governor (1939–1944), he was also Grand Master of the Grand Lodge of South Australia.

The Vice-Regal couple spent as much time as they could at the Vice Regal Summer Residence at Marble Hill, where they restored the gardens. An avid railway enthusiast, he also had a large-scale outdoor model railway installed there, and in 1943 the South Australian Railways new steam locomotive class South Australian Railways 520 class number 520 was named after him.

He retired from the Vice-Regal post for health reasons on 26 April 1944, whereupon he returned to his  Scottish estate which he had inherited in 1924. He served as deputy lieutenant of Aberdeenshire (1945), a member of the Aberdeenshire City Council (1945–55) and Grand Master of the Grand Lodge of Scotland (1949–53). He wrote A History of the Great North of Scotland Railway, which was published in 1940. He was a Knight of the Order of St John.

Death
Sir Charles Malcolm Barclay-Harvey died in London on 17 November 1969, aged 79.

References

External links 

1890 births
1969 deaths
People educated at West Downs School
Alumni of Christ Church, Oxford
British Army personnel of World War I
Gordon Highlanders officers
Members of the Parliament of the United Kingdom for Scottish constituencies
Unionist Party (Scotland) MPs
Governors of South Australia
Scottish Freemasons
Knights Commander of the Order of St Michael and St George
UK MPs 1923–1924
UK MPs 1924–1929
UK MPs 1931–1935
UK MPs 1935–1945
Australian Freemasons
Members of the Royal Company of Archers